Aniko Glogowski-Merten (born 25 March 1982) is a German teacher and politician of the Free Democratic Party (FDP) who has been serving as a member of the Bundestag since 2021.

Early life and education
Merten was born 1982 in the East German town of Havelberg. She studied at the Otto von Guericke University Magdeburg (2001–2007), the Braunschweig University of Art (2007–2010) and the Technical University of Braunschweig (2007–2010).

Political career
Merten became member of the FDP in 2013.

Merten became member of the Bundestag in 2021, representing the Braunschweig district. In parliament, she has since been serving on the Committee on Cultural and Media Affairs, the Committee on Climate Action and Energy and the Committee on Foreign Affairs. In addition to her committee assignments, she has been co-chairing the German Parliamentary Friendship Group for Relations with the States of Central Asia.

Personal life
In 2022, Merten married to Robert Glogowski, the son of Gerhard Glogowski.

References 

Living people
1982 births
Members of the Bundestag for the Free Democratic Party (Germany)
21st-century German politicians
Members of the Bundestag 2021–2025